The Children is a French comedy film directed by Marguerite Duras. It was entered into the 35th Berlin International Film Festival where it won an Honourable Mention.

Cast
 Axel Bogousslavsky as Ernesto
 Daniel Gélin as Enrico
 Tatiana Moukhine as Natasha
 Martine Chevallier as Nicole (as Martine Chevalier)
 André Dussollier as Le directeur d'école
 Pierre Arditi as Le journaliste

References

External links
 

1985 films
1985 comedy films
1980s French-language films
Films based on works by Marguerite Duras
Films directed by Marguerite Duras
French comedy films
1980s French films